Situated in the east of Cambridgeshire, the village of Little Downham is located just  north of the city of Ely. The Parish of Downham comprises Little Downham and Pymoor. It has an approximate population of 2660 with approximately 35 miles for footpaths around the parish. The population was measured at the 2011 Census as 2,589.  

It was one of only two sites in Cambridgeshire to be covered by the Survey of English Dialects.

In the Domesday Book of 1086 the village is called Duneham. At the time the Fens were mostly flooded, and the village is on a small rise of solid ground (visible today), so there may have been 'dunes' there.

In a map from 1648 (above), 'Downham' is shown at the north-west edge of the Isle of Ely, hence its historic name of 'Downham-in-the-Isle'.

Local Nature Reserve
Little Downham Local Nature Reserve is situated adjacent to the Bishop's walk.  It consists of four sections of land, measuring a total of 17 acres.

Local Events
Each year a village fete is staged in June and in the same month a Medieval Fair is held just outside the village. In September the local primary school organises a Scarecrow Fair, that sees the village lined with Scarecrows for the week building up to the fair. The annual Ely New Year's Eve 10k Race, organised by Ely Runners, both begins and ends in Little Downham. The 2011 race featured 700 runners and involved one circuit of the fen around Little Downham.

Bishop's Palace 
The village contains the grade II listed remains of the old Bishop's Palace formerly used by the Bishops of Ely.

References

External links

 Little Downham Scarecrow Week 2011
 Little Downham Medieval Fair 2011
 Little Downham Village Fete 2011
 Little Downham - Ely On-line
 Little Downham Parish Community Website
 CCAN web page

Villages in Cambridgeshire
East Cambridgeshire District